David Forsey is a British businessman, the former CEO of the British retail chain Sports Direct, until his resignation in September 2016.

Forsey started working for Mike Ashley at the age of 18, and continued for the next 32 years.

In 2015 Sports Direct subsidiary USC, a clothing retailer, went into administration. In the two preceding months leases for many of USC's stores were transferred to another subsidiary, Republic, and the USC trademark was transferred to another Sports Direct company. In October 2015 Forsey was charged with a criminal offence for consultation failures over USC staff who only had 15 minutes notice of redundancy.

In September 2016, Forsey resigned as CEO, after 32 years with Sports Direct.

In May 2017 The Sunday Times reported that Forsey will be prosecuted over the collapse of USC. He had previously tried to block the prosecution through a judicial review.

References

Living people
British chief executives
Year of birth missing (living people)